Sir George Joseph Bean, OBE (19 September 1915 – 19 November 1973) was a British barrister and High Court judge who sat in the Queen’s Bench Division from 1969 until his death four years later.

Born into a Jewish family, Bean was the son of George and Phoebe Bean. He was educated at the Liverpool Institute and Liverpool University, where he was president of the students' union in 1937–38. He served in the British Army from 1939 to 1946, reaching the rank of colonel in the Royal Army Service Corps, and was mentioned in despatches.

Having been called to the Bar by the Middle Temple in 1940, Bean became a Queen's Counsel in 1963. He was Recorder of Carlisle from 1965 to 1969, when he was elevated to the High Court of Justice, receiving the customary knighthood. Assigned to the Queen's Bench Division, he sat there until his death in 1973. He was a member of the Parole Board from 1972 until his death.

His son is Sir David Bean, a Lord Justice of Appeal.

References

1915 births
1973 deaths
People educated at Liverpool Institute High School for Boys
Alumni of the University of Liverpool
Queen's Bench Division judges
English King's Counsel
Royal Army Service Corps officers
English Jews
Members of the Middle Temple
20th-century King's Counsel
Officers of the Order of the British Empire
Knights Bachelor
British Army personnel of World War II